Buzan (alt. Buzun) was khan of the Chagatai Khanate from 1333 to 1334 (or from 1334 to 1335). He was the son of Duwa Temür.

Following the death of his uncle Tarmashirin, Buzan took control of the khanate. Sources described him as a Muslim, though he apparently favored the traditional Mongol yasa law. After only a short time as khan, however, he was overthrown by his cousin Changshi.

References

Jackson, Peter, The Delhi Sultanate: A Political and Military History. Cambridge University Press, 2003, .

Chagatai khans
Mongol Empire Muslims
14th-century monarchs in Asia